Umerkot District was initially created in 1993, but later on, due to some political reasons, it was abolished and merged with district Mirpurkhas in December 2000. However, after four years, it was restored in December 2004. District Government Umerkot has a website where you can find the official information about the district.

Umerkot, also known as Amarkot, (Urdu: عمرکوٹ) is a town in the province of Sindh, Pakistan. It is also referred to as Amar Kot by old historians, including Tej Singh Solanki, who refers to the city as Amar Kot Itehas. The city is well connected with the other large cities like Karachi, the provincial capital and Hyderabad.

Creation, Abolition and Revival of District Umerkot
District Umerkot was constituted during the year 1993 comprising four talukas, viz. Umerkot, Samaro, Kunri, and Pithoro. Subsequently, it was abolished and merged with district Mirpurkhas form 01-12-2000. It has again been revived vide Notification No: 1/18/93/Rev-I(iv) /1051 dated 13-12-2004, with its same jurisdiction.

District Government System
The Government of Sindh in the interest of good governance and effective delivery of services and participation of the people at the gross root level has promulgated Sindh Local Government Ordinance 2001 in order to devolve political power and decentralized administrative and financial authority to accountable Local Governments.

Geographical Boundaries

Geographically district Umerkot is located in the south-east corner of Sindh.

It is surrounded by:
District Sanghar in its north
District Mirpurkhas in its west.
District Tharparkar in its south-east.

Financial Position of District Government Umerkot
The District received an amount of Rs. 2,00,87,451/- from the District Government Mirpurkhas as share of District Government Umerkot for expenditure on the schemes relating to the below mentioned sectors:

Rural Development (Farm to Market Road) 
i.	ADP ongoing schemes
ii.	Chief Minister Directives
iii.	Abandoned schemes
Education	
Health
Agriculture

During the year 2005–06, the elected District Government came into existence, who prepared and passed its own budget keeping in view the policies of Local Government, priorities, financial strategy and plans in financial terms, with following expected receipts and expenditures in accordance with new chart of accounts.

Receipts 	1,43,37,97,934
Expenditure	1,42,52,81,655
Saving		85,16,279
The Annual Budget for the financial year 2006-07 is prepared strictly in accordance with the Budget Rules 2002 and according to the new chart of account, with following expected receipts and expenditure.
Receipts 	1,46,46,82,902
Expenditure	1, 46,41,62,418
Saving		5,20,484

Financial Decentralization
On account of financial decentralization, complete delegation of sanction authority is vested in the District Government which has facilitated the District Government to carry out more development projects, for betterment of general public of local area however, administrative authority is required to be extended in order to achieve the desired results at gross roots level.

Source of Revenue
The district being a newly created having got no its own source of revenue and as such it has to depend upon indicative grant of the provincial government. Study is under the way to generate the funds / its own revenue by adopting the following measures.
1.	To identify new source of revenue.
2.	Adjust user charges, fees and rates.
3.	Review establishment costs.
4.	Encourage local contribution.

Accounting and Auditing System
The new accounting and auditing system and its reconciliation has reduced the chances of excess expenditure, irregularities and un-authorized expenditure.

Zila Council Monitoring Committees
The Zila Council has elected monitoring committee for each group of offices of the District Government. Its functioning has improved the working of the District Government offices.

Service Delivery
Service delivery is tremendously increased because most of the decisions taken at district level which include interalia budgeting, planning & development and social services like Health, Education and Water Management.

Basic Facts

Total Area		è	5608 km2

Total Population	è	664797

Literacy Rate		è 38.56%

Number of TMAs, UCs, Dehs
No. of TMAs		è	04

No. of U.Cs		è	27

No. of Dehs		è	235

Educational institutions

Education development
As for as the development in Education Sector is concerned it is worthy to mention that District Umerkot has remained fortunate in achieving remarkable progress in infrastructure, construction and effective functionalization in the sector.
Nearly 411 new buildings as per details given below have been constructed from 2001 to up to date reflecting keen interest of District Government for giving top priority to education sector.

Boys Primary Schools 		323
Girls Primary Schools 		23
Boys Middle Schools 		45
Girls Middle Schools 		7
Boys High Schools 		3
Girls High Schools 		6
Girls Higher Secondary School 	1
Girls Degree College 		1
Mono technic College 		1
Moreover, sincere efforts have been made with practical steps to provide all lacking facilities to the schools preferably girls schools in form of additional class rooms, water, furniture, Lavatory, compound wall, repair, colouring and science equipment.
With the construction of this large number of school buildings the reasonable facilities have been provided to the public to get their children quality and standard education in the District.

So far the functionalizing of institutions is concerned nearly 105 schools including primary, secondary and college particularly girls schools have been made functional out of 440 by District Government Umerkot despite acute shortage of staff. The  following schools been functionalized: 
1.	Govt. Girls Degree College Umerkot
2.	Govt. Mono technic College Umerkot
3.	Govt. Girls High School Sadhar Palli
4.	Govt. Girls High School Dhoronaro
5.	Govt. Middle School Ghulam Nabi Shah
6.	Govt. Girls Middle School Bandhio Soomro
7.	Govt. Primary School Bhano Ranjit Oad Gharibabad

8.	Govt. Primary School Mandhal Lakhmir Oad

9.	Govt. Primary School Mir Mohammad Banglani
10.	Govt. Primary School Chhato Palli
11.	Govt. Primary School Azeem Palli
12.	Govt. Primary School Mohib Mangrio
13.	Govt. Primary School Jadam Mangrio
14.	Dost Mohammad Banglani
15.	Govt. Primary School Noor Hassan Khoso
16.	Govt. Primary School Nabi Bux Mehar
17.	Govt. Primary School Hurabad
18.	Govt. Primary School Abdul Karim Palli
19.	Govt. Primary School Azam Banglani
20.	Govt. Primary School Sarag Din Chachar
21.	Govt. Primary School Fazalani
22.	Govt. Primary School Mohammad Samoon
23.	Govt. Primary School Mugtor
24.	Govt. Primary School Soomar Samejo
25.	Govt. Primary School Usman Samoon
26.	Govt. Primary School Pirchi Ge Wari
27.	Govt. Primary School Bandho
28.	Govt. Primary School Soofi Akber Hussain
29.	Govt. Primary School Amin Samejo
30.	Govt. Primary School Hajrani Paro
31.	Govt. Primary School Achar Nohri
32.	Govt. Primary School Arbab Ali Nohri
33.	Govt. Primary School Wawari
34.	Govt. Primary School Umer Nohri
35.	Govt. Primary School Mochar Nohri
36.	Govt. Primary School Sago Nohri
37.	Govt. Primary School Tejo Je Dhani
38.	Govt. Primary School Amir Din Halepoto
39.	Govt. Primary School Silario
40.	Govt. Primary School Din Mohammad Nohri
41.	Govt. Primary School Laplo
42.	Govt. Primary School Arbab Ali Rahimoon
43.	Govt. Primary School Seendal Nohri
44.	Govt. Primary School Faisal abad
45.	Govt. Primary School Kamal Samejo
46.	Govt. Primary School Kirshan Menghwar
47.	Govt. Primary School Chhor Farm
48.	Govt. Primary School Mir Mohammad Rajput
49.	Govt. Primary School Aserlo
50.	Govt. Primary School Din Mohammad Chang
51.	Govt. Primary School Sobdar Bheel
52.	Govt. Primary School Mehboob Jo Par
53.	Govt. Primary School Mundhar Bachaiyo Paro
54.	Govt. Primary School Hussain Samejo Dinor
55.	Govt. Primary School Ahmed Ji Dhani
56.	Govt. Primary School Dhamraro
57.	Govt. Primary School Karnejo Tar
58.	Govt. Primary School Kunbhar Bada
59.	Govt. Primary School Gul Mohammad Panhwar
60.	Govt. Primary School Khan Mohammad Sand
61.	Govt. Primary School Mitho Jogi
62.	Govt. Primary School Sakhi Mohamamd Samejo
63.	Govt. Primary School Aklo
64.	Govt. Primary School Sadoori Shahani Paro
65.	Govt. Primary School Shoukat Ali Dars
66.	Govt. Primary School Janhero Main
67.	Govt. Primary School Shoukat Ali Dars
68.	Govt. Primary School Fateh Mohamamd Dal
69.	Govt. Primary School Amrhar Halepoto
70.	Govt. Primary School Dhani Bux Rind
71.	Govt. Primary School Faqir Abdullah
72.	Govt. Primary School Haji Hanif Mangrio
73.	Govt. Primary School Seth Assan Das Khatri
74.	Govt. Primary School Arab Bheel
75.	Govt. Primary School Taj Mohammad Khoso
76.	Govt. Primary School Manthar Aziz Mangrio
77.	Govt. Primary School Soomar Nohri
78.	Govt. Primary School Pancho Bheel
79.	Govt. Primary School Haji Halepoto Bhanano
80.	Govt. Primary School Ahmed Dars
81.	Govt. Primary School Haji Hussain Malkani
82.	Govt. Primary School Noor Mohammad Palli
83.	Govt. Primary School Abdul Rahim Palli
84.	Govt. Primary School Ibrhamani Arisar
85.	Govt. Primary School Abdul Qadoos Sand
86.	Govt. Primary School Allah Bachayo Mollah
87.	Govt. Primary School Mohammad Hashim Mangrio
88.	Govt. Primary School Rana Jamshad
89.	Govt. Primary School Punhoon Rajar
90.	Govt. Primary School Hajani Hawa
91.	Govt. Primary School Marzo Rajar
92.	Govt. Primary School Anwar Ali Nohri
93.	Govt. Primary School Mataro Mangrio
94.	Govt. Primary School Khamiso Mangrio
95.	Govt. Primary School Lal Mohammad Khaskheli
96.	Govt. Primary School Bheel Paro Kunbhar
97.	Govt. Primary School Aziz Arain
98.	Govt. Primary School Mir Wali Mohammad Talpur
99.	Govt. Primary School Sodo Kapri
100.	Govt. Primary School Abdul Haque Arain
101.	Govt. Primary School Mavji Kachhi
102.	Govt. Primary School Anwar Boobak
103.	Govt. Primary School Naseem abad
104.	Govt. Primary School Habib Palli
105.	Govt. Primary School Saeed Khan Jamali
106.    Govt. Primary School Bashir Ahmed Siddiqui
107.    Govt.Primary School Irshad Ahmed Siddiqui
108.    Govt.Primary School HR Siddiqui

Women's institutions, betterment and social uplift
Education of women their betterment and uplift of social conditions is a part of the core policy of District Government Umerkot.
Nearly 400 Girls Institutions are there in Education Department ranging from Primary to College Level for provision of quality education to the female of this District.

In order to provide easy approach to the girls special packages have been given to them in form of scholar ship, free text books and necessary assistance as required in this regard.
Efforts are being made to provide job opportunities to educated women belonging to for off and remote areas of District for functionalizing schools through SMC funds.

Education Department is fully supported by energetic, dedicated and committed District Government Leadership in extending and spreading education with provision of all basic facilities to the public and with particular focus on uplift of Female Education.
As already discussed the district is newly created one having acute shortage of personnel in each and every group of offices. The staff could not be appointed due to constant ban on the employment. It is, therefore, expedient to lift the ban on appointments or necessary permission may be accorded to appoint the staff on contract basis as a special case.

Health Facilities

Health sector development
The Taluka Hospital Umerkot has been upgraded to the level of Civil Hospital / District Headquarters Hospital.
Three Rural Health Centers viz Samaro, Kunri and Pithoro has been upgraded to the level of Taluka Headquarters Hospital.
The following dispensaries and Basic Health Units have been made functional in the financial year 2005–06.
1.	Basic Health Unit Rana Jageer
2.	Basic Health Unit Nabisar Thar
3.	Government Dispensary Jaloo-jo-Chaunro
4.	Government Dispensary Mitho Rajar
5.	Government Dispensary Jumoon Nohri
6.	Government Dispensary Noor Mohammad Mangrio
7.	Government Dispensary Hurabad.
The following Maternity Home / Dispensaries are under construction in the district and District Government Umerkot has allocated Rs. 1 Crore for their completion and they will be made functional in the year 2006–07.
1.	MCH Center Shewani Mohalla
2.	MCH Center Shadi Palli
3.	MCH Center Nabisar Road
4.	MCH Center Mahendre-jo-Par
5.	MCH Center Umerkot City
6.	MCH Center Samaro City
7.	Government Dispensary village Arif Khan Bhurgri
8.	Government Dispensary village Ameer Sultan Chandio
9.	Government Dispensary village Fateh Mohammad Kapri
10.	Government Dispensary village Fakir Ahmed Ali Dadhro
11.	Government Dispensary village Kamal Khan Rind
12.	Government Dispensary village Darelo Mori
13.	Government Dispensary village Sher Khan Rind
14.	Government Dispensary village Atta Mohammad Palli  
15.     Government Dispensary Village Dhatorio Achar Nohrio
The abandoned scheme of Rural Health Center Fakir Ameen Mangrio was restarted on a scheme of renovation, worth Rs. 40 Lac, sanctioned by the District Government. A plan for rehabilation and Renovation of Health facilities with support and funded by ADP has been submitted to Provincial Government for approval with cost of 34 million.

The Medical and Para-medical is trained by the Women Health Project for effective management of health facilities.
Lady health workers and staff concerned with Extended Program of Immunization (EPI) is also trained.
New Lady Health Workers and Drivers are recruited to provide medical cover to the remote areas of different union councils.

Immunization and Polio Eradication
In year 2004–05, 100% result of Polio Eradication was achieved. There were 06 cases of Polio in the District Umerkot. Now District Umerkot is Polio free.

The OPD in the health facilities is increased to 552760 in comparison of 435934 of the year 2004.
About 31000 children of age 0–11 months are vaccinated for prevention against 7 diseases, about 20000 women are vaccinated with Tetnus Vaccine in 5th round and about 80000 in 6th round.

Community involvement
There is involvement of community / people of the area at local level through the Citizen Community Boards who voluntarily look after the service deliveries like health, education, water management etc. Besides, the registration of 70 CCBs, Health Management Committees (HMCs), School Management Committees (SMCs) and Community Based Organizations (CBOs) are also constituted in order to ensure more community participation in various forms of development activists and improvement in service delivery. Apart from this the CCBs have to act for mobilization of stake holder for community involvement in the improvement, maintainace of facilities, welfare of the handicapped, widows and families in extreme poverty.
Social Welfare Department Actively  Working in District Umerkot specially  field in  the  creation of Social awareness by motivational method, & socio  economic development  of  people particularly  women,  professional  &  Financial assistance registered Voluntary Social Welfare Agencies & control  over Voluntary  Social Welfare Agencies Eradication of Social evils, Assist relief & rescue services during calamities & National emergency, are as under:-

Women's welfare centres
There are four women Welfare Centers/Industrial Homes actively functioning for uplift the socio economic condition & standard of female of the area. The centers are  providing  skill  development  services  on  modern  method  to the female  to  learn  &  earn  along  with  basic knowledge of education to fulfill their requirement, they are also participated various exhibition organized by Govt: & Non Govt: organization   to   introduce   cultural  articles & provided market facilities through District  Resource   Committee   &   Department.   The   495   girls    students   were trained from different centers & 117 girl students are under training & also Celebration of Women Day.

NGOs

The registered NGOs before LGOS-14 & registered NGOs after LGOS, 2001 is-52, number of non governmental institutions are working for the betterment of the people, like FYG is one of the network run by Germans under president ship of HR Siddiqui to spread the network of awareness . Pakistan Relief foundation is working since 2 years in Umerkot on Health care, Education and relief. 
Shifa Foundation has been actively working in Umarkot in delivering services to Nutritional status and in 2017 extended its interventions to add WASH component i.e. provision of safe drinking water to vulnerable communities.

Relief work
In  this  regard organized relief camps with the joint venture District Administration &  NGOs  provided  relief  material  to   the   Earth   Quake   victims   of   N.W.F.P, Azad  Kashmir  &  Punjab  effected  people.

Child welfare
There  are  three Institutions namely, Desert Flower KG & Middle School Umerkot, Enrolment  is  472,  Roshan   KG   &   High  School Kunri is 696 & Chandni Public School, Samaro is 82, functioning in the District &   provided  education on modern method, technology to the children.

CCBs
(A) Registered CCB's ---------------------------------------70
(B) Received Scheme from various CCB -----------------------33                              
(C) Approved Schemes on priority basis by Zila Council -----21

Water User Association
Registered Water Users Association ------------------------ 234

Disabled people
Disable Assessment Board, Umerkot issued Certificate to disable person to obtain their 2% Quota in all respect ------------------09

Irrigation
The District is irrigated by canals
Its main canals are:
Nara Canal
Mithrao Canally

Agriculture
Almost all kinds of crops are grown in the district. However, its major crops are Cotton, Chillies, Sugar-cane, Wheat, Jawar, Bajra, Maize and Sun-flower.

Zila Nazim
Zila Nazim is head of District Government and is required to provide vision for efficient  functioning of District Government. due to absence of local govt system there is no Zila Nazim of District Government Umerkot.

District Coordination Officer
District Coordination Officer is co-ordinating head of District administration and he is required to ensure that business of various group of offices is carried out in accordance with the laws, and to act as Principal Accounting Officer. Presently Ghulam Akbar Laghari is the District Coordination Officer of District Umerkot.

Executive District Officer
Executive District Officer is executive head of his respective group of offices.

Citizen Community Board
Citizen Community Boards  are set up in local areas to carry out development activity through community participation by executing the scheme and contributing 20% cost thereof.

Gender development
In order to improve gender development the District Government has reserved 33% seats for women. Attention has also been given towards enrollment of women / ladies in all the government institutions.
In order to empower the women the Sindh Local Government Ordinance – 2001 has also reserved 25% seats in each monitoring committee. The Government of Sindh, Women Development Department, is also taking efforts for gender development in this respect. It has released a sufficient amount as an incentive grant called as Gender Development Grant under National Gender Development Plan. The said amount can be utilized for the following purposes.
(a)	Skill development.
(b)	Training
(c)	Legal aid to women
(d)	Support of maternal and child healthcare
(e)	Women's literacy
(f)	Facilities for women conciliators
(g)	District Gender Resource Center
(h)	Establishment, modification and / or improvement of basic facilities for Women like specific space, day care, toilets, rest rooms etc.
(i)	Improvement for girls education
(j)	Any other activity / project / facility suggested / recommended by majority of Women Councilors within the function assigned to District Governments.

Taluka and Union Administration
In addition to the District Government, the Taluka and Union Administration have also been set up for solving the problem of masses at the door step level.

Musalihat Anjuman
Musalihat Anjuman are also constituted in each union council consisting of panel of three Musaleheen where the matters are referred even by any competent court having jurisdiction for amicable settlement.

Further information
If you want to know more about District Government Umerkot, please visit official website of District Government Umerkot.

External links
The Information Technology Department, District Government has launched District Government Umerkot's official websites.

1. District Government Umerkot Official website (English Version)

2. District Government Umerkot Official website (Sindhi Version)
 
3. District Government Umerkot Official website (Sindhi Version)

and https://web.archive.org/web/20101106101248/http://www.umerkot.qsh.eu/

Umerkot District